Cooston is an unincorporated community in Coos County, Oregon, United States. It is located on the east shore of Coos Bay across from North Bend, about eight miles from the city of Coos Bay.

The origin of the name Cooston is the same of that of Coos County, after the Coos people. Cooston post office was established in 1908 and closed in 1939. The post office was named by town founder William E. Homme, who was also the first postmaster. Homme's father was the founder of Wittenberg, Wisconsin. The post office was in Homme's store. Before moving to Cooston, Homme published the Glendale News in Glendale.

References

Unincorporated communities in Coos County, Oregon
1908 establishments in Oregon
Populated places established in 1908
Unincorporated communities in Oregon